Swarzewo railway station is a railway stop serving the village of Swarzewo, in the Pomeranian Voivodeship, Poland. The station opened in 1903 and is located on the Reda–Hel railway. The train services are operated by Przewozy Regionalne.

The station used to be known as Schwarzau (Westpreußen). The station used to be located on the Swarzewo–Krokowa railway which was dismantled in 2005 after losing passenger traffic in 1989 and freight traffic in 1991.

Modernisation
The station was rebuilt in 2014 as part of the modernisation of the Reda–Hel railway.

Train services
The station is served by the following services:

Regional services (R) Władysławowo - Reda - Gdynia Główna
Regional services (R) Hel - Władysławowo - Reda - Gdynia Główna

During the summer months long-distance services also operate to/from Hel.

References 

 This article is based upon a translation of the Polish language version as of September 2016.

External links

Railway stations in Poland opened in 1903
Railway stations in Pomeranian Voivodeship
Puck County